"Good Day" is a song by Sean Maguire, released in May 1996 as his sixth single to promote Maguire's second album, Spirit. The single was his most successful, reaching number 12 in the UK Singles Chart, his highest chart position to date.

Track listing
CD1
"Good Day"
"Good Day" (Motiv 8 Northside Mix)
"Good Day" (Motiv 8 Southside Dub)
"Good Day" (Bear Mix)

CD2
"Good Day"
"No Choice In The Matter"
"Count On Me"
"I'm The One For You"

References

1996 singles
Sean Maguire songs
1996 songs
Parlophone singles
Songs written by Martin Brannigan
Songs written by Ray Hedges